Pushpaka may refer to:
 Flower in Sanskrit language
 Pushpaka Vimana, a flying chariot mentioned in the Hindu epic Ramayana
 Pushpaka Brahmin, a semi-Brahmin caste in Kerala
 Pushpaka (Caste), one of the various castes in Pushpakabrahmin Community of Hindus in Kerala

See also
 Pushpaka Vimana (disambiguation)